NGC 356 is a spiral galaxy in the constellation Cetus. It was discovered on September 27, 1864 by Albert Marth. It was described by Dreyer as "very faint, small, irregularly round."

References

External links
 

0356
18640927
Cetus (constellation)
Intermediate spiral galaxies
003754